Bong Man-dae (born 1970) is a South Korean actor, director, and scriptwriter. He is known as a soft-core porn director.

Biography
Bong was born in 1970 in Gwangju, South Korea. Before making his mainstream feature film debut in 2003, Bong directed 15 straight-to-video films which were acknowledged for their strong narratives and stylish visuals. He also directed the TV series which was broadcast in 2004.

Filmography

Director
Trap
Cinderella
The Sweet Sex and Love

Actor
Love, So Divine
Handphone
The Sword with No Name

Writer
The Sweet Sex and Love

References

External links
Bong Man-dae on Hancinema.net

1970 births
Living people
People from Gwangju
South Korean male film actors
South Korean film directors